Dangerous Encounters with Brady Barr is a television program hosted by Brady Barr on Nat Geo WILD, National Geographic Channel's sister network. It originally started on the flagship network.

Episodes

External links
 Official site on Nat Geo WILD
 TV Series on imdb.com

2005 American television series debuts
2000s American documentary television series
2010s American documentary television series